The 1960 World Open Snooker Championship was a Round-robin snooker tournament held at the Science Hall, Exhibition Grounds, Brisbane, from 6 to 17 July 1960. Fred Davis was the champion, winning all seven of his matches. The tournament received press coverage under several different names, including "World Championship", "World Professional Tournament" and "World Snooker Tournament." The tournament was organised by Cecil Klingner, the president of the Queensland Snooker Association, and was sanctioned by the Billiards Association and Control Council. All matches were the best of nine .

In his opening match, against Frank Harris, Davis compiled a break of 123, which at the time the highest ever recorded in Australia, and remained the highest of the tournament. His later break of 102 in the tournament was the second century break ever scored in competition in Australia. During his visit to Australia he also made a 103 break during an exhibition match, that was broadcast on 18 July 1960 on the ABN show Sports Cavalcade. Davis received £750 as champion.

Kevin Burles defeated Frank Harris 5–2 in a play-off for second place.

Final table

Match results
Match winners are shown in bold.

References

1960 in snooker
1960 in Australian sport
July 1960 sports events in Australia